Wild Cat, also known as Coacoochee or Cowacoochee (from Creek Kowakkuce "bobcat, wildcat") (c. 1807/1810–1857) was a leading Seminole chieftain during the later stages of the Second Seminole War and the nephew of Micanopy.

Background
Wild Cat's exact year and place of birth is not agreed upon. Many local scholars believe he was born in 1807 on an island in big Lake Tohopekaliga, south of present-day Orlando. Some scholars say Wild Cat was born around 1810 to King Philip (or Ee-mat-la) and his wife in Yulaka, a Seminole village along the St. Johns River in northern Florida. Still others suggest that he was born near present-day Apopka, Florida. Wild Cat may have had a twin sister who died at birth. As a twin, he was regarded by the tribe as being particularly gifted.

As tensions mounted between the Seminole and local settlers following the purchase of Florida by the United States in 1821, the bands encouraged the escape of slaves from neighboring Georgia to disrupt settlement in Florida by European Americans. The latter were taking over former Seminole territory.

At the start of the Second Seminole War, the nineteen-year-old Wild Cat gained prominence leading a band of Seminole and Black Seminole until his father was captured in 1837 and imprisoned in Fort Marion.

In October 1837, Wild Cat appeared before American forces in a ceremonial peace headdress, claiming to be an emissary of the war chief Osceola. After he negotiated with Colonel Thomas S. Jesup, American authorities agreed to peace talks, but when the Seminole representatives arrived to treat, Jessup ordered their arrest. While imprisoned at Fort Marion, Wild Cat escaped with nineteen other Seminole. They reportedly fasted for six days until they could slide between the bars of their jail cell; they then dropped from the walls into the moat on the outside of the fort.

After Osceola was imprisoned, Wild Cat emerged as the leading commander of the war among the Seminole, fighting with Alligator and Arpeika against Colonel Zachary Taylor at the inconclusive Battle of Lake Okeechobee on December 25, 1837 before retreating to the Everglades. In 1841, two years after his father had died while being deported to Indian Territory, Wild Cat agreed to meet American authorities for peace negotiations. After negotiating with Lieutenant William T. Sherman's commanding officer, Major Childs, at the Indian River post of Fort Pierce, Wild Cat agreed to be transported to Fort Gibson in Oklahoma's Indian Territory, along with his remaining two hundred followers. Growing depressed over his forced surrender, he was said to have stated, "I was in hopes I would be killed in battle, but a bullet never reached me."

Traveling to Washington, D.C. in 1843 with Alligator as part of a Seminole delegation, Wild Cat failed to gain financial aid for the Seminole. The tribe had suffered a series of floods on their reservation, as well as slave raids by neighboring Creek. (The latter captured free blacks and Indians and sold them to southern slave holders, although Indian slavery had long been prohibited). This devastated the black and Indian Seminole. Conditions continued to worsen until 1849.

That year Wild Cat left the reservation with about one hundred followers, consisting of Seminole and Black Seminole, who included some refugee slaves, and escaped to Texas. Joined by about one thousand Kickapoo, Wild Cat's band eventually established a new community in Mexico. The government awarded the tribe an area of land in recognition for their service against Apache and Comanche raiders. Earning a commission as Colonel in the Mexican army, Wild Cat would live with the Seminole in Alto, Mexico until his death of smallpox in 1857. His son Gato Chiquito (in Spanish), or Young Wild Cat, was chosen as chief.

Legacy
On May 29, 2012 an application was registered at the US Bureau of Geographic Names to name a stretch of unnamed barrier islands on the Florida East Coast for this chief.

Quotes
"I speak for myself, for I am free. Each of the others also speak for themselves. We are a choir of voices that will drown out your lies."

References
Johansen, Bruce E. and Donald A. Grinde, Jr. The Encyclopedia of Native American Biography, New York: Henry Holt and Company, 1997.

1857 deaths
19th-century births
Deaths from smallpox
Escapees from United States federal government detention
Native American leaders
Native Americans imprisoned at Fort Marion
Native Americans of the Seminole Wars
People from Apopka, Florida
Pre-statehood history of Florida
19th-century Seminole people